The Gin Fizz 37 is a French sailboat that was designed by Michel Joubert of the Joubert-Nivelt design firm, as a cruiser and first built in 1974.

Production
The design was built by Jeanneau  and also by Gibert Marine in France, from 1974 until 1981 with 494 boats completed, but it is now out of production. A number were imported into the United States.

Design
The Gin Fizz 37 is a recreational keelboat, built predominantly of fiberglass, with wood trim. It has a masthead sloop rig or optional ketch rig, with a deck-stepped mast, two sets of straight spreaders and aluminum spars with stainless steel wire rigging. The hull has a raked stem, a reverse transom, a skeg-mounted rudder controlled by a wheel and a fixed swept fin keel. Both center and aft cocopit models were built. It displaces  and carries  of iron ballast.

The design has sleeping accommodation for ten people, with a double "V"-berth in the bow cabin, an "U"-shaped settee and a straight settee in the main cabin along with two pipe berths and an aft cabin with a double berth. The galley is located on the starboard side at the companionway ladder. The galley is "L"-shaped and is equipped with a three-burner stove, an ice box and a double sink. A navigation station is opposite the galley, on the port side. The head is located just aft of the bow cabin on the port side and includes a shower.

Operational history
In a 2007 review for Sailing magazine, John Kretschmer wrote, "the boat is a capable cruiser with ideal accommodations for a couple, or small family. It is well built, looks nice when you row out to her on the mooring and is extremely affordable."

A review in Blue Water Boats stated, "the Jeanneau Gin Fizz is saltier than its name might suggest. Peddled by the fledgling Jeanneau company in the late 1970's she's a 37 ft 6 inch fibreglass production cruiser, designed by Michel Joubert, that has earned a credible reputation as an affordable offshore passage maker. Although not a classic blue water cruiser, the Gin Fizz has proved her mettle on a number of circumnavigations and plentiful ocean crossings."

See also
List of sailing boat types

References

External links

Keelboats
Catamarans
1970s sailboat type designs
Sailing yachts
Sailboat type designs by Michel Joubert
Sailboat types built by Jeanneau
Sailboat types built by Gibert Marine